The Demokrāti.lv, known as Jaunie Demokrāti prior to 2009, was a centrist and "Euro-realist" political party in Latvia. It was formed in 2004 when two members of the Latvian parliament, Māris Gulbis and Ināra Ostrovska broke away from the New Era Party.  The New Democrats were aligned with the pan-European EUDemocrats organisation.

The New Democrats won 1.27% of vote and no seats in the parliament in 2006 election. After the election, they started talks with For Fatherland and Freedom/LNNK about a possible merger, which were unsuccessful.

After the 2009 rebrand, the party participated in the 2009 Latvian municipal elections, gaining few seats. Before the 2010 Latvian parliamentary election the party was one of the founders of the Made in Latvia political alliance, but shortly afterwards was expelled from it.

On March 10, 2011, the party announced that it had dissolved. Its last chairman was Edgars Jansons.

External links
Official web site

2004 establishments in Latvia
Political parties established in 2004
Political parties in Latvia
Defunct political parties in Latvia
Centrist parties in Latvia
Political parties disestablished in 2011